Monta Vista is an upper-income residential neighborhood in western Cupertino, California, the 11th wealthiest city with a population over 50,000 in the United States.  "Monta Vista" means "mountain view" in Portuguese and is very similar to "Monte Vista," which means "mountain view" in Spanish. However, it is not affiliated with the nearby city of Mountain View.

Orchards and vineyards used to cover Monta Vista. After the 1940s, Monta Vista became the first housing tract in the Cupertino area. Residential homes then quickly replaced the orchards and vineyards.

When Cupertino decided to incorporate in 1955, Monta Vista decided at the last moment not to join the effort, remaining an unincorporated part of Santa Clara County. Over the years, Cupertino annexed pieces of Monta Vista as it was redeveloped lot by lot. By the late 1990s, only scattered pockets of unincorporated land were left in Monta Vista. Cupertino finally annexed the rest of the neighborhood in 2004.

Starting in the 1990s, settlement by Asian American families accelerated; currently, a large proportion of the neighborhood is Asian American. Many of Monta Vista's residents work in Silicon Valley's high-tech computer industries.

The community also has some neighborhoods with much larger custom built houses ranging from 3000– of living space area. The neighborhood is very sought-after due to its desirable location, low crime rate, and its academically high-performing schools, including Monta Vista High School and Kennedy Middle School. Monta Vista High School was ranked by Newsweek as one of the 100 top academically performing public high schools in the United States.

Attractions in Monta Vista include the Fremont Older Open Space Preserve, Monte Bello Open Space Preserve, Picchetti Ranch Open Space Preserve (next to Picchetti Brothers Winery), Blackberry Farm, Deep Cliff Golf Course, Cupertino Hills Swim and Racquet Club, Linda Vista Park, Varian Park, Monta Vista Park and Stevens Creek Reservoir. McClellan Ranch Park, located just west of Monta Vista High School, is a nature preserve and historical park formerly owned by the McClellan family.  Along with John T. Doyle, this family was one of the first residents of the area. This site also preserves the original ranch, milk barns and livestock barns with animals raised by resident volunteers.

Gallery

References

External links

Neighborhoods in Cupertino, California